Stuckenia pectinata (syn. Potamogeton pectinatus), commonly called sago pondweed or fennel pondweed, and sometimes called ribbon weed, is a cosmopolitan water plant species that grows in fresh and brackish water on all continents except Antarctica.

Description
Stuckenia pectinata is a fully submerged aquatic plant and does not have any floating or emerged leaves.

The flowers are wind pollinated and the seeds float. Tubers that are rich in starch are formed on the rhizomes. Reproduction can either be vegetative with tubers and plant fragments or sexual with seeds.

Wildlife
The whole plant provides food for different species of waterbirds.

Description

Stuckenia pectinata has long narrow linear leaves which are less than 2 mm wide; each is composed of two slender, parallel tubes. The main difference from other narrow-leaved pondweeds is that the stipule joins the leaf base, when it is pulled the sheath and stipule comes away, similar to a grass sheath and ligule. The fruits are 3 to 5 mm long.

Ecology
The nutritious tubers are an important food source for waterfowl, including the canvasback, which help disperse the plant.

The plant can become a nuisance weed in waterways such as canals, because it is tolerant to eutrophication.

Gallery

References

External links
Jepson Manual Treatment - Stuckenia pectinata

Potamogetonaceae
Flora of Asia
Flora of Africa
Flora of North America
Flora of Central America
Flora of South America
Flora of Europe
Aquatic plants